Joan Merrill portrait

Joan Merrill (January 2, 1918 – May 10, 1992) was an American singer and actress.

Career
Merrill began her career in the 1930s on radio and later sang at nightclubs across the United States, including at the Copacabana in New York City, the Thunderbird in Las Vegas, Nevada, and the Rio Cabana in Chicago. In addition to live performances she starred in the 1941 musical film Time Out for Rhythm and, in 1942, had roles in The Mayor of 44th Street and Iceland, in which she introduced the song There Will Never Be Another You, which became a jazz standard. Following popular themes of American music during World War II, her songs were patriotic and inspired by American involvement in World War II.

Merrill died in New York City on May 10, 1992, at age 74.

Songs performed on film
Time Out for Rhythm (1941)
 "Obviously the Gentleman Prefers to Dance"
Iceland (1942)
 "You Can't Say No to a Soldier"
 "I Like a Military Tune"
 "There Will Never Be Another You"

References

External links
 

1918 births
1992 deaths
Musicians from Baltimore
20th-century American singers
Singers from Maryland
20th-century American women singers